Antonov is a masculine Russian surname that is derived from the male given name Anton and literally means Anton's. I.e., it is a patronymic surname derived from the Antonius root name. Its feminine counterpart is Antonova. It may refer to:

 Aleksandr Antonov (disambiguation), several people
 Aleksei Antonov (1896–1962), a Soviet Army general
 Anatoly Antonov (born 1955), the Russian ambassador to the United States
 Dmytro Antonov (born 1996), Ukrainian footballer
 Oleg Konstantinovich Antonov (1906–1984), a Soviet aircraft designer and industrial manager
 Sergei Antonov (1948–2007), a Bulgarian accused of involvement in attempt by Mehmet Ali Ağca to kill Pope John Paul II
 Vadim Antonov (born 1965), Russian/American software engineer and entrepreneur
 Vladimir Aleksandrovich Antonov (born 1975), Russian banker and entrepreneur
 Vladimir Antonov-Ovseyenko (1883–1939), a Soviet statesman and party figure
 Yuri Antonov (musician)
 Yuri Antonov (disambiguation)

See also

Anton (disambiguation)
Antona, a genus of moths
Antono (name)
Antonov
Antonova
Antonovna
Antonovca (disambiguation)
Antonovka

References

Russian-language surnames
Bulgarian-language surnames
Patronymic surnames
Surnames from given names